Hypaeus tridactylus is a species of jumping spider from the Brazilian Amazon, specifically Juruti, Pará.

References

Salticidae
Spiders of Brazil
Spiders described in 2015